Sir Gilbert de Aton, 1st Baron Aton, of Ayton, Langdon, Malton and Wintringham, Yorkshire was a 13th-14th century English noble. He died c. 1342.

Life

Gilbert was the son and heir of William de Aton of Ayton and Isabel, daughter of Simon de Vere of Goxhill and Sproatley and Ada de Bertram.

During inquisitions during 1315, it was found that Gilbert de Aton, was heir to Baron Vescy, William de Vescy through descent from Margery de Knapton, daughter and heir of Warin de Vescy of Knapton. He then established in 1316 and 1317 his claim as heir to the lands of Baron Vesci, William de Vescy of Kildare. Gilbert did homage on 7 November 1317 to Edward II of England. Gilbert was in Scotland in 1319 during the siege of Berwick Castle. The Scots burnt his manor of Malton in 1319 during a raid into Yorkshire. During 1323 he confirmed the previous grant by Antony Bek, Bishop of Durham of Alnwick Castle to Henry Percy, Lord Percy and his successors, for the payment of the sum of 700 marks.
 
Baron Aton attended three English Parliaments on 30 December 1324, 20 February 1325, and 25 February 1342, after being summoned by writs. He died in 1342. His Will heard on 10 April 1350 at Wintringham indicated he was to be buried at Watton Priory and was succeeded by his son and heir William.

Citations

References

Year of birth unknown
1342 deaths
Barons Aton
People from the East Riding of Yorkshire
English MPs 1324
English MPs 1325
English MPs 1341